A Doll's House is a 1973 drama film directed by Joseph Losey, based on the 1879 play A Doll's House by Henrik Ibsen. It stars Jane Fonda in the role of Nora Helmer and David Warner as her domineering husband, Torvald.

Losey's version of the play was extensively adapted for film. From Ibsen's expository dialogue, entire new scenes were developed by British dramatist David Mercer and integrated through a number of invented sets.

Plot
Set in nineteenth century Norway, Ibsen's A Doll's House focuses on the married life of banker Torvald Helmer and his wife Nora. A young middle-class couple with three small children, their seemingly respectable marriage is revealed to be a broken and bloodless matter.

The Helmers live in an unequal partnership, dominated by Torvald. Although he professes to love her, Torvald constantly chides Nora for what he calls her careless and childlike nature; he often calls her his "doll". He proudly thinks of himself as the family's breadwinner and protector, but he remains unaware of the secret that Nora holds: she had saved him, when he had become seriously ill and very nearly destitute. Without his knowledge, she had borrowed a large sum of money so that he could temporarily retire and recuperate. She told him the money had been inherited from her family; in truth it had been a private loan from Nils Krogstad, one of Torvald's coworkers. Nora has been scrupulously repaying him in small installments skimmed from her household allowance.

Torvald, it turns out, already holds the boorish Krogstad in contempt for various reasons. When Torvald is appointed bank director, one of his first acts is to fire his unlikable coworker. The desperate Krogstad attempts to blackmail Nora – she must persuade Torvald to keep him on the job, or he will tell all about the secret loan. Its existence would be embarrassment enough for Nora, but Krogstad threatens to reveal the most shocking news of all: Nora had forged her father's signature as a co-signer on the contract.

The story includes important subplots regarding the unexpected tenderness of Krogstad (toward Nora's friend Kristine, his old flame) and the quixotic love interest (toward Nora) of the elderly Dr. Rank. But the essential conflict comes when Torvald gets a letter from Krogstad describing the loan. Indignantly, Torvald pours scorn on his wife for her morals, intellect, and financial sense; he cuts short her explanations, and declares that she will be allowed no hand in raising their children.

His fury seems infinite until suddenly a second letter from Krogstad arrives. It contains Nora's contract, complete with forged signature and surrendered without explanation. Torvald holds the incriminating evidence in his hand, utterly relieved, and begins to make weak apologies for his outburst. But in the meantime Nora has had a transformational realization about her love and marriage. She stands up to Torvald, explains her new vision, and then – against all customs of the day – walks out on him forever.

Cast
 Jane Fonda – Nora Helmer
 David Warner – Torvald Helmer 
 Trevor Howard – Dr. Rank
 Delphine Seyrig – Kristine Linde
 Edward Fox – Nils Krogstad
 Ingrid Natrud – Helene the maid
 Pierre Oudry – Olssen the porter
 Anna Wing – Anne-Marie the nanny
 The Helmers' children were portrayed by Morten Floor (Bob), Tone Floor (Emmy), and Frode Lien (Ivar).
 Krogstad's son and daughter were portrayed by Dagfinn Hertzberg and Ellen Holm.

Production
The cinematographer was Gerry Fisher, who had a long professional relationship with Losey beginning in the mid-1960s during the director's British period and including such titles as Accident (1967), The Go-Between (1971), and Don Giovanni (1979).

Adaptation
Ibsen's three-act play was adapted to a screenplay by Losey in collaboration with British dramatist David Mercer. The original text takes place in a single room in a single day, but the Mercer/Losey version is expanded. Much of the expository dialogue of Act I is converted into an extensive prologue. Events that are only discussed by the actors in the Ibsen play – such as the early friendship of Nora and Kristine, the romance and breakup of Kristine and Krogstad, the life-threatening illness of Torvald, and the death of Nora's father – are all fleshed out in full separate scenes at the start of the film.

The one-room setting of Ibsen's original is a deliberate device suggestive of Nora's isolation and her imprisonment within her marriage. In the film, however, multiple locations outside the Helmer house are used for visual explication, and to lend dramatic emphasis to plot points. Even within the house, the camera moves from room to room, revealing not just the physical comforts of their home but also its confining nature – its "deadly insularity". The combined effect of Losey's alterations have been praised by some critics for giving the work a comprehensively cinematic quality, and make it "a film rather than a photographed play".

Losey intended his added scenes to step beyond a plain visualization of Ibsen's dialogue and achieve artistic merit in their own right. Critic Colin Gardner has commented on one example at the start of the film: "just as we see Nora and Kristine skidding excitedly across the surface of the pond, we also spot a static, black-coated figure lurking ominously outside the teahouse in the exact centre of the shot (i.e. at the spatial vanishing point). This turns out to be Krogstad, steeling himself for his fateful rejection by Kristine. The sweet purity of youth is thus already tainted by the acrid taste of the social outcast – the future man of vengeance – and the source of Nora's own financial enslavement."

Other critics found Losey's bold changes to be off-putting, even blasphemous. Writing in The New York Times, Nora Sayre complained bitterly that the film had been "fattened with feeble lines and even short scenes that the old genius didn't write".

Filming
Filming took place in the Norwegian town of Røros, where local residents served as extras for the exterior scenes.

Music
French composer Michel Legrand provided the musical soundtrack, a "bright, horn-dominated neoclassical score".

Cast and director conflict
Fonda's feminist sensibilities not only informed her performance but also her relationship with Losey. The director, who had a history of stormy relationships with his leading ladies, earned the ire of both Fonda and Delphine Seyrig before the film was even released. In a letter from June 1973, Fonda assailed Losey for making "anti-feminist remarks to the press", and charging that "your [Losey's] inability to deal with, to countenance, strong women... has done irreparable harm to the film". On a personal note, she added: "I was never able to penetrate your paranoia or snobbery while we were working together". Losey, for his part, grumbled that Fonda had "little sense of humor" and "was spending most of her time working on her political speeches, instead of learning her lines".

Release
A Doll's House was first aired in the United States on the ABC television network on 23 December 1973. It had been shown at the 1973 New York Film Festival, and was screened at the 1973 Cannes Film Festival, but wasn't entered into the main competition. In June 1980, it was given a nine-day run at one of the Laemmle Theatres in Los Angeles.

Losey's film was one of two English-language versions of Ibsen's play released in 1973: the other version was directed by Patrick Garland and stars Claire Bloom and Anthony Hopkins. The coincidental competition for a relatively small audience meant commercial difficulties for both films.

Reception
The choice of Fonda for the principal role has always elicited some commentary on her casting and performance. Known as a high-profile supporter of feminism, Fonda took the role at a time when the U.S. women's rights movement was at its peak. Many film critics praised Fonda's work – Leonard Maltin cited it as the main reason to see the film (which he otherwise deemed only "moderately successful"). Charles Champlin likewise praised her performance, and wrote that her contemporary persona dovetailed well with Mercer's dialogue, which "skillfully drops the stilted period rhetoric without going colloquial or slangy".

Some critics have suggested that the film suffers under the weight of Fonda's public image. Professor Neil Sinyard wrote, "Perhaps the star's own feminist associations obscure our vision of the character's blind and painful quest towards self-awareness and undermine the shock of Nora's startling decision (startling, that is, to a nineteenth century audience) to walk out on her husband and children." More bluntly, Rex Reed wrote that Fonda's "star personality" undercut her performance in an otherwise admirable production: "One never believes her as the macaroon-munching birdbrain or the charming coquette or the toy wife. In the great scene of defiance at the end, she takes the film with a tank".

References

Bibliography

External links 
 
 

1973 films
1970s historical drama films
British historical drama films
Films shot at EMI-Elstree Studios
Films set in Norway
Films shot in Norway
French historical drama films
Films based on A Doll's House
Films directed by Joseph Losey
Films scored by Michel Legrand
English-language French films
1973 drama films
1970s English-language films
1970s British films
1970s French films